Toby Morland (born 27 February 1983) is a New Zealand rugby union player. His position of choice is halfback. Morland currently plays for Manawatu in the Mitre 10 Cup.

He made his Super rugby debut for the Highlanders in 2004 and played for them until 2008. He was selected because of his strong performance in the Air New Zealand Cup when he played for Otago.

Personal life 
Morland has been living in the Manawatu, working as a personal trainer at the business he and his partner, Kate, started in Palmerston North. He has been playing club rugby for Te Kawau. Morland has four children.

Otago 
Since his debut for Otago in 2002 against Marlborough, Toby Morland was a regular player for the province, at times having to battle with Chris Smylie for the starting position. Morland has played 36 matches for Otago, scoring 20 points.

Highlanders
Morland first played for the Highlanders in 2004 against the Chiefs. Morland was a regular back up to Jimmy Cowan throughout his Super rugby career, having played 23 matches and scored 15 points.

Chiefs
Morland was drafted into the Chiefs squad for the 2009 Super 14 season.

Munster
On 11 June 2009, Morland signed a six-month contract with Munster, he joined on 1 July. He won 4 caps for Munster and scored 1 try before returning to New Zealand in November 2009.

Manawatu 
In 2015 Morland was called in as injury cover for Kayne Hammington who bruised his ribs at a training camp. He signed on a week-by-week contract until Hammington had recovered.

He re-signed for the Turbos to play in the 2016 season. He started the first two games.

References

External links
 Munster Profile
 Chiefs player profiles
 Manawatu Turbos profile

1983 births
Living people
New Zealand rugby union players
Highlanders (rugby union) players
Blues (Super Rugby) players
Chiefs (rugby union) players
Otago rugby union players
Auckland rugby union players
Rugby union players from Oamaru
Young Munster players
Munster Rugby players
Manawatu rugby union players
Rugby union scrum-halves
New Zealand expatriate rugby union players
New Zealand expatriate sportspeople in Ireland
Expatriate rugby union players in Russia
Expatriate rugby union players in Ireland